Lois Landgraf is an American politician and a former Republican member of the Colorado House of Representatives. She represented District 21 from January 9, 2013, to January 13, 2021.

Education
Landgraf earned her bachelor's degree in science from the University of Maryland and her MBA from the University of Washington.

Elections
2012 With District 21 incumbent Republican Representative Bob Gardner redistricted to District 20, Landgraf won the June 26, 2012 Republican Primary with 2,293 votes (60.4%); and won the three-way November 6, 2012 General election with 13,707 votes (65.7%) against Libertarian candidate Laticia Burns and American Constitution candidate Sean Halstead.

References

External links
Official page at the Colorado General Assembly
 

Place of birth missing (living people)
Year of birth missing (living people)
Living people
Republican Party members of the Colorado House of Representatives
People from Fountain, Colorado
University of Washington Foster School of Business alumni
Women state legislators in Colorado
21st-century American politicians
21st-century American women politicians